St John's Church is a redundant Anglican church in Newchurch Road, Cloughfold, Rawtenstall, Lancashire, England.  It is recorded in the National Heritage List for England as a designated Grade II listed building.

History

The church was built in 1889–90 to a design by the Lancaster architects Paley, Austin and Paley.  It cost £5,000, and provided seating for 500 people.  The commission resulted from a competition assessed by Ewan Christian.  The church was declared redundant on 1 May 1976, and has since been used as a warehouse.  Its rood screen was removed to St Nicholas' Church, Newchurch.

Architecture
St John's is constructed in sandstone with a slate roof.  Its architectural style is Arts and Crafts Perpendicular.  The church stands on a north–south axis, and its plan consists of a nave with low aisles, a chancel, a porch, and double transepts.  At the southwest is the base of an intended tower incorporating a porch, which rises to a height of only .  It contains diagonal buttresses, a doorway above which is blind arcading, and a pyramidal roof.

See also

 Listed buildings in Rawtenstall
 List of works by Paley, Austin and Paley

References

Citations

Sources

Grade II listed churches in Lancashire
Gothic Revival church buildings in England
Gothic Revival architecture in Lancashire
Paley, Austin and Paley buildings
Former Church of England church buildings
Church of England church buildings in Lancashire
Buildings and structures in the Borough of Rossendale